Jürgen Melzer and Philipp Petzschner were the defending champions, but lost in the quarterfinals to Bob and Mike Bryan.

The Bryan brothers defeated Robert Lindstedt and Horia Tecău in the final, 6–3, 6–4, 7–6(7–2), to win the gentlemen's doubles title at the 2011 Wimbledon Championships.

The men's doubles event was originally scheduled to begin on 22 June, but due to bad weather it was delayed until the next day. To accommodate other rain delayed matches, the first round matches were played best of three sets, with best of five set scoring being resumed in the second round.

Seeds

  Bob Bryan /  Mike Bryan (champions)
  Max Mirnyi /  Daniel Nestor (second round)
  Mahesh Bhupathi /  Leander Paes (second round)
  Rohan Bopanna /  Aisam-ul-Haq Qureshi (first round)
  Jürgen Melzer /  Philipp Petzschner (quarterfinals)
  Michaël Llodra /  Nenad Zimonjić (semifinals)
  Mariusz Fyrstenberg /  Marcin Matkowski (first round)
  Robert Lindstedt /  Horia Tecău (final)
  Eric Butorac /  Jean-Julien Rojer (second round)
  Mark Knowles /  Łukasz Kubot (first round)
  Wesley Moodie /  Dick Norman (third round)
  Juan Ignacio Chela /  Eduardo Schwank (third round)
  Marcelo Melo /  Bruno Soares (second round)
  Marcel Granollers /  Tommy Robredo (third round)
  Marc López /  David Marrero (second round)
  Daniele Bracciali /  František Čermák (second round)

Qualifying

Draw

Finals

Top half

Section 1

Section 2

Bottom half

Section 3

Section 4

References

External links

2011 Wimbledon Championships – Men's draws and results at the International Tennis Federation

Men's Doubles
Wimbledon Championship by year – Men's doubles